The 2004 Liège–Bastogne–Liège took place April 25, 2004 and saw Davide Rebellin win his first Liège–Bastogne–Liège, capping a victorious week having already won the Amstel Gold Race and La Flèche Wallonne to complete a rare Ardennes triple. The previous year's winner, Tyler Hamilton, finished in ninth position.

Results

External links
Results from cyclingwebsite.net

2004
Liege-Bastogne-Liege
2004 in Belgian sport
April 2004 sports events in Europe
2004 in road cycling